Nela or NELA may refer to:

Nela (film), 2018 Sinhalese film by Bennett Rathnayake
Nela (footballer), Angolan footballer
Nela (name), a given name and surname
Nela (river), in Spain
Nela Park, the headquarters of GE Lighting in East Cleveland, Ohio
NELA, National Electric Light Association, defunct organization in the United States
New England Library Association
Northeast Los Angeles